Aegilips ( appear in the Iliad in the form of ) is an Ancient Greek name of an island in the Ionian Sea, near Ithaca. In Homer's Iliad, book II, Aegilips is part of Odysseus's kingdom. According to an attempt by the ancient geographer Strabo to localize it, Aigilips was on the Ionian island of Leucas, together with the places Neritos and Krokyleia also mentioned in the ship catalogue, while the grammarian Stephanos of Byzantium localized all three places on the Ionian island of Ithaca. Some researchers, including Wilhelm Dörpfeld estimate that Aegilips is present day island of Meganisi.

Geography of the Odyssey
Islands of Greece
History of the Ionian Islands
Mythological islands
Locations in the Iliad
Landforms of Ithaca
Landforms of the Ionian Islands (region)

References

Populated places in ancient Ionian Islands